Skylark is a children's historical novel and a sequel to the Newbery Medal-winning novel Sarah, Plain and Tall. It follows the lives of the Witting family after Sarah Wheaton's arrival. It was adapted into a film of the same name.

Plot overview
After Jacob and Sarah marry, a severe drought forces the family to make a drastic decision. While Jacob remains on the farm, Anna and Caleb travel with Sarah to Maine in order to take refuge from the drought. The journey teaches them the power of family can transcend distances as they wait for the day when they can be reunited again.

References

1994 American novels
American children's novels
American novels adapted into films
Children's historical novels
1994 children's books